The 1999 Warsaw Cup by Heros doubles was the doubles event of the fifth edition of the Warsaw Open; a WTA Tier IV tournament held in Warsaw, Poland. Olga Lugina and Karina Habšudová were the champions last year when it was a Tier III event. Habšudová did not compete this year, while Lugina teamed up with Sandra Načuk. She was defeated in the quarterfinals.

First seeds Cătălina Cristea and Irina Selyutina won the tournament, defeating Amélie Cocheteux and Janette Husárová in the final.

Seeds

Draw

Qualifying

Seeds

Qualifiers
 ''' Tina Pisnik /  Silvija Talaja

Qualifying draw

External links
 1999 Warsaw Open Qualifying Draw
 1999 Warsaw Open Main Draw

Doubles
Warsaw Cup by Heros
1999 in Polish tennis